Suspicions' is an album by saxophonist Houston Person recorded in 1980 and released on the Muse label.

Reception

Allmusic awarded the album 3 stars noting that it contains "Some robust funk and fine soul licks, plus solid mainstream fare".

Track listing 
 "Suspicions" (Eddie Rabbitt, David Malloy, Randy McCormick, Even Stevens) - 5:26  
 "If"  (David Gates) - 3:55  
 "Me & Me Brudder" (Sonny Phillips) - 3:25  
 "Pieces" (Horace Ott) - 5:07  
 "Blue Monk" (Thelonious Monk) - 8:42  
 "This Bitter Earth" (Clyde Otis) - 4:44  
 "Let's Love Again" (Ott) - 4:58

Personnel 
Houston Person - tenor saxophone 
Virgil Jones - trumpet
Jack Cavari, Melvin Sparks - guitar
Ernie Hayes, Horace Ott, Sonny Phillips - keyboards
Wilbur Bascomb - bass
Idris Muhammad - drums
Ralph Dorsey - percussion

References 

Houston Person albums
1980 albums
Muse Records albums
Albums arranged by Horace Ott
Albums recorded at Van Gelder Studio